The Siege of Colonia del Sacramento took place between October 1735 and September 1737, during the Spanish–Portuguese War (1735–1737).

Siege 
On 20 October 1735, 2 cavalry companies of 160 men under the command of captain Inácio Pereira da Silva left the stronghold and observed the movement of the Spanish army, Salcedo, who was at the vanguard, caught them and sent 600 men to fight them. The fight lasted until the night, and the Spaniards suffered heavy casualties. 

On 9 December, the Spaniards fired 2,440 round shots and 66 bombs against the city, that opened a breach in the walls of the stronghold. The Spaniards began to attack through the breach constantly, but without success.

On 16 March 1737, under influence of France, Great Britain and the Dutch Republic, a treaty was signed in Paris.

In September, the ship of the line Nossa Senhora da Boa Viagem, under the command of Duarte Pereira, arrived at Colonia del Sacramento with articles of the armistice. Vasconcelos sent the articles to the captain José Inácio de Almeida that sent them to Salcedo, ending the siege.

References 

Sieges involving Portugal
Sieges involving Spain